Kreshnik Ivanaj (born 27 January 1982) is a retired Albanian football player.

Personal life
He is now a physical education teacher at a school in Lezhë.

Honours
Individual
Albanian First Division Top Goalscorer (1): 2011-12

References

1982 births
Living people
People from Lezhë
Association football forwards
Albanian footballers
Besëlidhja Lezhë players
KF Bylis Ballsh players
KS Shkumbini Peqin players
KF Laçi players
FC Kamza players
KF Adriatiku Mamurrasi players
FK Kukësi players
KS Burreli players
KS Iliria players
Kategoria Superiore players
Kategoria e Parë players